The White Spider is a 1963 West German crime thriller film directed by Harald Reinl and starring Joachim Fuchsberger, Karin Dor and Horst Frank. It is based on a novel of the same name by the Czech writer Louis Weinert-Wilton.

The film's sets were designed by the art director Ernst H. Albrecht. Location shooting took place in London, Hamburg and West Berlin. It was made and promoted to look like a German Edgar Wallace movie, using the same director and several actors from the Wallace film series.

Plot
When Muriel Irvine's husband is killed in an automobile accident after a night of gambling, she discovers that he had previously dramatically increased his life insurance coverage. The insurance company alerts Scotland Yard to a recent rash of such deaths all affecting gamblers. When the Yard's chief inspector is murdered while investigating the case, they bring in a mysterious detective to solve it.

Cast

References

External links

1960s thriller films
German thriller films
West German films
Films directed by Harald Reinl
Films set in London
Constantin Film films
1960s German films